The Dunbar Historic District is a nationally recognized historic district on S Paul Laurence Dunbar Street in Dayton, Ohio. The district is famous for being the home of Paul Laurence Dunbar.

On June 30, 1980, it was added to the National Register of Historic Places

A larger area known as Wright-Dunbar (or Mound-Horace) is bounded roughly by US 35, Broadway Street, West Third Street and the Great Miami River. This district has also been known for housing many ethnic groups such as Hungarians, Romanians, and African Americans. After World War I the Wright-Dunbar area was known as the cultural and commercial center of Dayton's African American community. Many black-owned stores, shops, and theatres gained popularity in Dayton, such as the "Palace Theatre". Decades later, in the 1950s and 1960s, much of the area was damaged during riots, urban renewal, and the construction of Interstate 75. Later, through an effort by the city of Dayton and the county, many of the houses in the district were brought back to life again.

References

External links
 Preservation Dayton
 Welcome to Wright Dunbar, Inc. | Wright Dunbar
 Press Release - Dayton Aviation Heritage National Historical Park (U.S. National Park Service)
 Mrs. Bush's Remarks After Visit to Wright-Dunbar Village
 https://web.archive.org/web/20070929031037/http://www.projdel.com/Wright-Dunbar.pdf
 HUDUSER Survey

National Register of Historic Places in Montgomery County, Ohio
Historic districts on the National Register of Historic Places in Ohio
Neighborhoods in Dayton, Ohio